Formoe is a surname. Notable people with the surname include:

Arild Formoe (1912–2006), Norwegian accordion player and orchestra conductor
Terje Formoe (born 1949), Norwegian singer, songwriter, actor, playwright, and author

Norwegian-language surnames